Dutch people who are famous or notable include:

Arts

Architecture 

Jaap Bakema (1914–1981)
Hendrik Petrus Berlage (1856–1934)
Jo van den Broek (1898–1978)
Jacob van Campen (1596–1657), Dutch Golden Age architect
Pierre Cuypers (1827–1921)
Willem Marinus Dudok (1884–1974)
Aldo van Eyck (1918–1999)
Lieven de Key (1560–1627), renaissance architect
Hendrick de Keyser (1565–1621), sculptor and architect
Rem Koolhaas (born 1944)
Jacobus Oud (1890–1963)
Satyendra Pakhale (born 1967)
Pieter Post (1608–1669), Dutch Golden Age architect
Gerrit Rietveld (1888–1964)

Film 

Willeke van Ammelrooy (born 1944), actress
Antoinette Beumer (born 1962), film director
Marjolein Beumer (born 1966), actress, screenwriter
Jan de Bont (born 1943), cinematographer
Erik-Jan de Boer (born 1967), animation director
Rene Daalder (1944–2019), director
Mike van Diem (born 1959), screenwriter and director
Bracha van Doesburgh (born 1981), actress
Philip Dorn (1901–1975), actor
Paul Driessen (born 1940), animator, director
Bobbi Eden (born 1980), porn actress
Cyrus Frisch (born 1969), director
Laura Gemser (born 1950), actress
Rijk de Gooyer (1925–2011), actor
Rutger Hauer (1944–2019), actor
Johannes Heesters (1903–2011), actor
Tom Holkenborg (Junkie XL) (born 1967), composer
Carice van Houten (born 1976), actress
Michiel Huisman (born 1981), actor
Famke Janssen (born 1964), actress
Martin Koolhoven (born 1969), screenwriter and director
John Kraaijkamp, Sr. (1925–2011), actor
Jeroen Krabbé (born 1944), actor
Sylvia Kristel (1952–2012), actress
Rik Launspach (born 1958), actor and writer
Dick Maas (born 1951), screenwriter and director
Anneliese van der Pol (born 1984), actress
Renée Soutendijk (born 1957), actress
Johanna ter Steege (born 1961), actress
Monique van de Ven (born 1952), actress
Paul Verhoeven (born 1938), director
Wiebe van der Vliet (born 1970), film editor
Yorick van Wageningen (born 1964), actor
Alex van Warmerdam (born 1952), actor, screenwriter and director
Zara Whites (born 1968), former pornographic film actress
Michaël Dudok de Wit (born 1953), animator, director
Emmanuel Ohene Boafo (born 1993), actor

Music 

Thomas Acda (born 1967), singer, actor
Sharon Den Adel (born 1974), singer of Within Temptation
Jan Akkerman (born 1946), guitar player
Amber (born 1969), singer
Elly Ameling (born 1933), classical music singer
Louis Andriessen (1939–2021), composer
Dick Annegarn (born 1952), singer, musician
Bart Berman (born 1938), pianist, composer
Marco Borsato (born 1966), singer
Willem Breuker (1944–2010), jazz musician
Herman Brood (1946–2001), rock musician and artist
Frans Brüggen (1934–2014), conductor, recorder player and baroque flautist
Theo Bruins (1929–1993), pianist, composer
Armin van Buuren (born 1976), trance DJ
Ferry Corsten (born 1973), trance DJ
Esmée Denters (born 1988), singer, made famous through YouTube
Cristina Deutekom (1931–2014), singer, classical music
Alphons Diepenbrock (1862–1921), composer
Anita Doth (born 1971), singer
Candy Dulfer (born 1969), saxophone player
Margriet Ehlen (born 1943), composer
Caro Emerald (born 1981), singer
Tess Gaerthé (born 1991), actress and singer
Martin Garrix (born 1996), House DJ
Afrojack (born 1987), House DJ
Jan van Gilse (1881–1944), composer
Boudewijn de Groot (born 1944), singer, actor
Jack Jersey (1941–1997), producer, composer, singer
Guus Meeuwis (born 1972), composer, singer
Stephen van Haestregt (born 1972), drummer of Within Temptation
Bernard Haitink (1929–2021), conductor Concertgebouworkest
Alex Van Halen (born 1953), drummer of Van Halen
Eddie Van Halen (1955–2020), guitarist of Van Halen 
Hardwell (born 1988), house DJ
Barry Hay (born 1948), singer of Golden Earring
André Hazes (1951–2004), singer
Oliver Heldens (born 1995), DJ
Koen Heldens (born 1986) mixing engineer 
Ilse Huizinga (born 1966), jazz singer
Dominique van Hulst (born 1981), singer, popularly known as Do
Janine Jansen (born 1978), violinist
Ruud Jolie (born 1976), guitarist of Within Temptation
Gerard Joling (born 1960), singer
Tom Holkenborg (born 1967), film composer, electronic musician, remixer, composer
Isabelle van Keulen (born 1966), classical violinist and violist, educator
Tim Kliphuis (born 1974), jazz violinist
Peter Koelewijn (born 1940), founder of Dutch rock & roll
Astrid Kruisselbrink (born 1972), composer
Natalie La Rose (born 1988), singer, dancer and model
Arjen Anthony Lucassen (born 1960), composer and musician
Gwendolyn Masin (born 1977), violinist, author, pedagogue, founder of GAIA Chamber Music Festival
Willem Mengelberg (1871–1951), conductor
Rogier van Otterloo (1941–1988), composer
Willem van Otterloo (1907–1978), composer
Jetty Paerl (1921–2013), singer (De vogels van Holland)
Willem Pijper (1894–1947), composer
Abbie de Quant (born 1946), flautist
André Rieu (born 1949), violinist, conductor, and composer
Nicky Romero (born 1989), house DJ
Julius Röntgen (1855–1932), composer
Ramses Shaffy (1933–2009), singer
Eva Simons (born 1984), singer-songwriter
Simone Simons (born 1985), vocalist of Epica
Peter Slaghuis (1960–1991), disc jockey
Ray Slijngaard (born 1971), singer and disc jockey
Jaap Spaanderman (1896–1985), pianist, cellist, conductor
Martijn Spierenburg (born 1975), keyboardist of Within Temptation
Jan Pieterszoon Sweelinck (1562–1621), composer and organist
Anouk Teeuwe (born 1975), singer
Herman van Veen (born 1945), singer, theater performer
Jeroen van Veen (born 1969), classical pianist and composer
Jeroen van Veen (born 1974), bassist of Within Temptation
Roel van Velzen (born 1978), singer
Matthijs Vermeulen (1888–1967), composer
Matthijs Verschoor (born 1955), classical pianist
Tijs Verwest (born 1969), DJ (better known as DJ Tiësto)
Klaas de Vries (born 1944), composer
Edo de Waart (born 1941), conductor
Johan Wagenaar (1862–1941), composer
Tony Wall (born 1988), guitarist
Robert Westerholt (born 1975), guitarist of Within Temptation
Jaap van Zweden (born 1960), violinist and conductor

Visual arts 

Pieter van Abeele (1622–1677), medallist
Bernard Accama (1697–1756), painter
Karel Appel (1921–2006), painter
Hendrick Avercamp (1585–1634), painter
Ludolf Backhuysen (1631–1708), painter
John Baselmans (born 1954), painter and illustrator
Helen Berman (born 1936), painter
Charles Bolsius (1907–1983), painters and print maker
Hieronymus Bosch (1450–1516), painter
Ambrosius Bosschaert (1573–1612), painter
Jan de Bray (1627–1697), painter
Dick Bruna (1927–2017), graphical artist
Paul Citroen (1896–1983), painter
Anton Corbijn (born 1955), photographer
Aelbert Cuyp (1620–1691), painter
Theo van Doesburg (1883–1931), painter
Willem Drost (1630–1680), painter and print maker
Ger van Elk (1941–2014), sculptor
M. C. Escher (1898–1972), graphical artist
Vincent van Gogh (1853–1890), painter
Jan van Goyen (1596–1656), painter
Mieke Groot (born 1949), glass artist
Frans Hals (1580–1666), painter
Jacoba van Heemskerck (1876–1923), painter, stained glass designer and graphic artist
Milou Hermus (1947–2021), painter
Jan van Herwijnen (1889–1965), painter
Pieter de Hooch (1629–1684), painter
Helena Klakocar (born 1958), cartoonist
Willem de Kooning (1904–1997), painter
Andrea Kruis (born 1962), illustrator
Jeanne de Loos-Haaxman (1881–1976), art historian
Han van Meegeren (1889–1947), forger of paintings
Jacobus Anthonie Meessen (1836–1885), photographer
Piet Mondrian (1872–1944), painter
Rien Poortvliet (1932–1995), painter and illustrator
Rembrandt van Rijn (1606–1669), painter
Willem de Rooij (born 1969), contemporary artist
Jacob van Ruisdael (c. 1628–1682), landscape painter
Geertgen tot Sint Jans (active 1465–1495), painter 
Peter Spier (1927–2017), illustrator
Jan Steen (1626–1679), painter
Marten Toonder (1912–2007), comic creator
Thierry Veltman (born 1939), painter and sculptor
Johannes Vermeer (1632–1675), painter
Gisèle d'Ailly van Waterschoot van der Gracht (1912–2013), painter
Hendrik Nicolaas Werkman (1882–1945), typographer and illustrator
Jacob de Wit (1695–1754), painter

Writers 

A. C. Baantjer (1923–2010), writer of detective fiction
Paul Biegel (1925–2006), writer of children's books
Remco Campert (1929–2022), novelist and poet
Jacob Cats (1577–1660), poet
Isabelle de Charrière (1740–1805), novelist
Louis Couperus (1863–1923), novelist and poet
Willy Corsari (1897–1998), novelist, actress and composer
Geert Groote (1340–1384)
Arnon Grünberg (born 1971)
Hella Haasse (1918–2011), novelist
Jan de Hartog (1914–2002), novelist and playwright
Herman Heijermans (1864–1924)
Willem Frederik Hermans (1921–1995), novelist
Pieter Corneliszoon Hooft (1581–1647)
Constantijn Huygens (1596–1687)
Gerrit Krol (1934–2013), novelist, poet
Hendrik Willem van Loon (1882–1944)
Geert Mak (born 1946), writer of history books
Harry Mulisch (1927–2010), novelist
Multatuli (1820–1887), novelist
Nescio (1882–1961)
Cees Nooteboom (born 1933), novelist
Willem Oltmans (1925–2004), journalist
Gerard Reve (1923–2006), novelist
Tjalie Robinson (1911–1974)
Annie M.G. Schmidt (1911–1995), children's writer
Philip Slier (1923–1943)
Joost van den Vondel (1587–1679), poet and playwright
Anne de Vries (1904–1964), novelist
Janwillem van de Wetering (1931–2008), novelist
Willy Wielek-Berg (1919–2004) film critic, writer, columnist
Jan Wolkers (1925–2007)

Exploration 

Willem Barentsz (c. 1550–1597), several expeditions to Arctic waters; discovered Spitsbergen
Abraham Blauvelt (1601–1663), Central America
Adriaen Block (1567–1627), New Netherland
Hendrik Brouwer (1580–1643), discovered the Roaring Forties
Olivier Brunel (c. 1540–1585), tried to find a passage around Siberia to China
Jan Carstenszoon (1600–1700), New Guinea coast, navigated the Gulf of Carpentaria in 1623
Robert Jacob Gordon (1743–1795), extensively traveled South Africa in the service of the Dutch East India Company
Dirk Hartog (1580–1621), VOC captain, charted mid-western coast of Australia
Jacob van Heemskerk (1567–1607), captain of one of Barent's ships on his last fatal expedition
Cornelis de Houtman (1565–1599), brother to Frederick, established Dutch trading route to the Spice Islands 
Frederick de Houtman (1571–1627), brother to Cornelis, charted several constellations in the southern skies, explored coast of Western Australia
Willem Janszoon (c. 1570–1630), first European expedition to make landfall on the Australian continent 
Jacob Le Maire (c. 1585–1616), Cape Horn, 1616 circumnavigation
Cornelius Jacobsen Mey, New Jersey (1614–1620)
Olivier van Noort (1558–1627), 1598 circumnavigation
Jacob Quaeckernaeck (1500–1606), reached Japan via Street of Magellan and Moluccas
Matthijs Quast (died 1641), Japan, Bonin Islands, and legendary islands East of Japan
Jan Rijp (c. 1570–c. 1613), saved remainder of Willem Barentsz's crew in 1597
Jakob Roggeveen (1659–1729), First European to reach Easter Island Easter 1722
Willem Schouten (1567–1625), Cape Horn, 1616 circumnavigation
Simon van der Stel (1639–1702), explored South Africa North and East of Cape Town
Abel Tasman (1603–1659), extensive voyages around Australia and southwest Pacific, discovered a.o. Tasmania, New Zealand and Tonga
François Thijssen (died 1638?), charted 1,000 miles of the Australian South Coast in 1627
Alexine Tinne (1839–1869), Sahara desert crossing
Willem de Vlamingh (1640–c. 1698), Western Australia
Sebald de Weert (1567–1603), discovered Falkland Islands

Fashion models 

Azra Akın (born 1981)
Wilhelmina Cooper (1940–1980)
Kim Feenstra (born 1986)
Bette Franke (born 1989)
Daphne Groeneveld (born 1994)
Daniella van Graas (born 1975)
Tatjana Maul (born 1988)
Rianne ten Haken (born 1986)
Touriya Vaughan-Haoud (born 1977)
Marpessa Hennink (born 1964)
Querelle Jansen (born 1985) 
Kim Kötter (born 1982) 
Doutzen Kroes (born 1985)
Karen Mulder (born 1970) 
Marcus Schenkenberg (born 1968)
Iekeliene Stange (born 1984)
Lara Stone (born 1983)
Romee Strijd (born 1995)
Yfke Sturm (born 1981)
Mark Vanderloo (born 1968)

Fictional characters 

Hans Brinker
Abraham Van Helsing
Peter Van Houten

Historians 

Henrica van Erp (c. 1480–1548)
Pieter Corneliszoon Hooft (1581–1647)
Johan Huizinga (1872–1945)
Loe de Jong (1914–2005)
Jan Gerard Kerkherdere (1677–1738)
Jan Romein (1893–1962)
Petrus Scriverius (1576–1660)
Boudewijn Sirks (born 1947)

Journalists 

Henk Hofland
Arendo Joustra
Almar Latour
Geert Mak
Mart Smeets

Military 

Gaius Julius Civilis, Batavian military commander, leader of the Batavian rebellion 
Jan Pieterszoon Coen (1587–1629), governor general of the Dutch East Indies
Karel Doorman (1889–1942), naval officer
Piet Pieterszoon Hein (1577–1629), naval officer
Frederick Henry, Prince of Orange (1584–1647), general and stadtholder
J. B. van Heutsz (1851–1924), governor general of the Dutch East Indies
Hendrick Lucifer (1583–1627), naval officer turned pirate
Maurice of Nassau, Prince of Orange (1567–1625), general and stadtholder
Michiel de Ruyter (1607–1676), naval officer
Cornelis Tromp (1629–1691), naval officer
Maarten Tromp (1598–1653), naval officer
Witte Corneliszoon de With (1599–1658), naval officer
Cornelis de Witt (1623–1672), naval officer and statesman

Philosophy 

Jacobus Arminius (1560–1609), philosopher and theologian
Isaac Beeckman (1588–1637)
Evert Willem Beth (1908–1964)
Cornelius van Bynkershoek (1673–1743), jurist and legal theorist 
Pieter de la Court (1618–1685), economist and political theorist
Herman Dooyeweerd (1894–1977), philosopher, Vrije Universiteit
Desiderius Erasmus (1466–1536), writer, polemicist, humanist, Protestant Reformation
Hugo Grotius (1583–1645), also lawyer, playwright, and poet
François Hemsterhuis (1721–1790)
Bernard Mandeville (1670–1733), philosopher, political economist and satirist
Johannes Jacobus Poortman (1896–1970)
Baruch Spinoza (1632–1677), philosopher
Cornelis Petrus Tiele (1830–1902), theologian and historian of religion

Politics

Before 20th century 

Pier Gerlofs Donia (1480–1520), warrior and freedom fighter
William the Silent (1533–1584), stadtholder
Johan van Oldenbarnevelt (1547–1619), statesman
Maurice of Nassau, Prince of Orange (1567–1625), general and stadtholder
Frederick Henry, Prince of Orange (1584–1647), general and stadtholder
Andries Bicker (1586–1652), regent of Amsterdam, statesman
Cornelis de Graeff (1599–1664), regent of Amsterdam, statesman
Andries de Graeff (1611–1678), regent of Amsterdam, statesman
Jan van Riebeeck (1619–1677), administrator and colonizer of Cape Town
Cornelis de Witt (1623–1672), statesman
Johan de Witt (1625–1672), statesman
William III of Orange (1650–1702), stadtholder and king of England
Johan Rudolf Thorbecke (1798–1872), prime minister

20th and 21st centuries

Dries van Agt (born 1931), Prime Minister of the Netherlands (1977–1982)
Jan Peter Balkenende (born 1956), Prime Minister of the Netherlands (2002–2010)
Louis Beel (1902–1977), Prime Minister of the Netherlands (1946–1948, 1958–1959)
Barend Biesheuvel (1920–2001), Prime Minister of the Netherlands (1971–1973)
Els Borst (1932–2014), Deputy Prime Minister, Minister of Health, Welfare and Sport
Wouter Bos (born 1963), Deputy Prime Minister, Minister of Finance
Ben Bot (born 1937), Minister of Foreign Affairs
Hans van den Broek (born 1936), Minister of Foreign Affairs, European Commissioner (1993–1999)
Jo Cals (1914–1971), Prime Minister of the Netherlands (1965–1966) 
Hendrikus Colijn (1869–1944), Prime Minister of the Netherlands (1925–1926, 1933–1939)
Pieter Cort van der Linden (1846–1935), Prime Minister of the Netherlands (1913–1918)
Ferdinand Domela Nieuwenhuis (1846–1919), first prominent Socialist
Willem Drees (1886–1988), Prime Minister of the Netherlands (1948–1958)
Wim Duisenberg (1935–2005), Minister of Finance, President of the European Central Bank (1998–2003)
Pim Fortuyn (1948–2002), politician, candidate for Prime Minister, assassinated during the 2002 election 
Cornelis van Geelkerken (1901–1979), National-Socialist, co-founder of the NSB
Dirk Jan de Geer (1870–1960), Prime Minister of the Netherlands (1926–1929, 1939–1940)
Jaap de Hoop Scheffer (born 1948), Minister of Foreign Affairs, Secretary General of NATO (2004–2009)
Hans Janmaat (1934–2002), right-wing nationalist
Piet de Jong (1915–2016), Prime Minister of the Netherlands (1967–1971)
Wim Kok (1938–2018), Prime Minister of the Netherlands (1994–2002)
Neelie Kroes (born 1941), Minister of Transport, Public Works and Water Management, European Commissioner for Competition (2004–2014)
Abraham Kuyper (1837–1920), Prime Minister of the Netherlands (1901–1905)
Ruud Lubbers (1939–2018), Prime Minister of the Netherlands (1982–1994), United Nations High Commissioner for Refugees (2001–2005)
Joseph Luns (1911–2002), Minister of Foreign Affairs, Secretary General of NATO (1971–1984)
Victor Marijnen (1917–1975), Prime Minister of the Netherlands (1963–1965)
Anton Mussert (1894–1946), National-Socialist, founder of the NSB
Pieter Oud (1886–1966), Founder of the People's Party for Freedom and Democracy
Alexander Pechtold (born 1965), Minister for Government Reform and Kingdom Relations 
Jan Pronk (born 1940), Minister for Development Cooperation, Minister of Housing, Spatial Planning and the Environment, Head of the United Nations Mission in Sudan (2004–2006)
Jan de Quay (1901–1985), Prime Minister of the Netherlands (1959–1963) 
Johan Remkes (born 1951), Deputy Prime Minister, Minister of the Interior
Charles Ruijs de Beerenbrouck (1873–1936), Prime Minister of the Netherlands (1918–1925, 1929–1933)
Piet de Ruiter (1939–2014), member of the House of Representatives of the Netherlands between 1971 and 1976 
Mark Rutte (born 1967), Prime Minister of the Netherlands (since 2010)
Pieter Jelles Troelstra (1860–1930), political activist for universal suffrage
Joop den Uyl (1919–1987), Prime Minister of the Netherlands (1973–1977)
Rita Verdonk (born 1955), Minister for Integration & Immigration 
Hans Wiegel (born 1941), Deputy Prime Minister, Minister of the Interior, Queen's Commissioner of Friesland
Geert Wilders (born 1963), prominent critic of Islam 
Gerrit Zalm (born 1952), Deputy Prime Minister, Minister of Finance
Jelle Zijlstra (1918–2001), Prime Minister of the Netherlands (1966–1967)

Royal Family 

William I of the Netherlands (1772–1843), King
William II of the Netherlands (1792–1849), King
William III of the Netherlands (1817–1890), King
Emma of Waldeck and Pyrmont (1858–1934), Queen consort, Queen regent (1890–1898)
Wilhelmina of the Netherlands (1880–1962), Queen
Juliana of the Netherlands (1909–2004), Queen
Bernhard of Lippe-Biesterfeld (1911–2004), Prince-consort
Beatrix of the Netherlands (born 1938), Queen 
Prince Claus (1926–2002), Prince-consort
Princess Irene of the Netherlands (born 1939)
Princess Margriet of the Netherlands (born 1943)
Princess Christina of the Netherlands (1947–2019)
Willem-Alexander of the Netherlands (born 1967), King
Máxima of the Netherlands (born 1971), Queen consort
Prince Friso of Orange-Nassau (1968–2013)
Prince Constantijn of the Netherlands (born 1969)
Princess Catharina-Amalia of the Netherlands (born 2003) 
Princess Alexia of the Netherlands (born 2005)
Princess Ariane of the Netherlands (born 2007)

Science and technology

Before 20th century 

Herman Boerhaave (1668–1738), physician
C.H.D. Buys Ballot (1817–1890), chemist and meteorologist
Ludolph van Ceulen (1540–1610), mathematician
Carolus Clusius (1526–1609), doctor and botanist
Menno van Coehoorn (1641–1704), military engineer
Laurens Janszoon Coster (1370–1440), printer
Cornelius Drebbel (1572–1633), inventor and engineer
Eise Eisinga (1744–1828), astronomer who built a scale of the solar system in his house 
David Fabricius (1564–1617), astronomer
Daniel Gabriel Fahrenheit (1686–1736), German-Polish physicist and engineer, lived most of his life in the Dutch Republic
Regnier de Graaf (1641–1673), physician and anatomist, who made key discoveries in reproductive biology
Jacobus Henricus van 't Hoff (1852–1911), chemist
Coenraad Johannes van Houten (1801–1887), chemist, inventor, known for the Dutch process chocolate
Christiaan Huygens (1629–1695), mathematician and physicist
Constantijn Huygens, Jr. (1628–1697; brother of Christiaan), scientific instrument maker, technological chronicler
Jan Ingenhousz (1730–1799), physiologist, botanist and physicist. 
Zacharias Janssen (1580–88 – pre-1632 to 1638), scientific instrument maker from Middelburg, associated with the invention of the first optical telescope
Petrus Jacobus Kipp (1808–1864), chemist, inventor of the Kipp apparatus
Jan Leeghwater (1575–1650), hydraulic engineer and mill builder
Anton van Leeuwenhoek (1632–1723), scientist
Hans Lippershey (1570–1619), inventor and scientific instrument maker, associated with the invention of the first telescope
Pieter van Musschenbroek (1692–1761), Dutch scientist, scientific instrument maker and inventor of Leyden jar 
Frederik Ruysch (1638–1731), botanist and anatomist
Frans van Schooten (1615–1660), mathematician
Willebrord Snell (1580–1626), astronomer and mathematician
Thomas Joannes Stieltjes (1856–1894), mathematician
Simon Stevin (1548–1620), mathematician and engineer
Jan Swammerdam (1637–1680), scientist
Franciscus Sylvius (1614–1672), physician and anatomist
Nicolaes Tulp (1593–1674), physician, surgeon and mayor of Amsterdam
Gustav de Vries (1866–1934), mathematician
Hugo de Vries (1848–1937), geneticist
Johannes Diderik van der Waals (1837–1923), physicist
Nicolaes Witsen (1641–1717), statesman, shipbuilder, geographer and cartographer
Hendrik Zwaardemaker (1857–1930), scientist

20th century

Wiebe Bijker (born 1951), social scientist
Nicolaas Bloembergen (1920–2017), physicist
Luitzen Egbertus Jan Brouwer (1881–1966), mathematician
Nicolaas Govert de Bruijn (1918–2012), mathematician
Hendrik Casimir (1909–2000), physicist
Paul J. Crutzen (1933–2021), atmospheric chemist
David van Dantzig (1900–1959), mathematician
Paul Ehrenfest (1880–1933), physicist
Chaim Elata (born 1929), Israeli professor of mechanical engineering, President of Ben-Gurion University of the Negev, and Chairman of the Israel Public Utility Authority for Electricity
George Uhlenbeck (1900–1988), theoretical physicist
Samuel Goudsmit (1902–1978), Dutch-American physicist
Dirk Brouwer (1902–1966), astronomer
Cornelis Johannes van Houten (1920–2002), astronomer
Tom Gehrels (1925–2011), astronomer
Willem Johan Kolff (1911–2009), physician and inventor
Peter Debye (1884–1966), chemist
Robbert Dijkgraaf (born 1960), physicist
Edsger Dijkstra (1930–2002), computer scientist
David Adriaan van Dorp (1915–1995), chemist
Eugène Dubois (1858–1944), paleontologist and anatomist
Christiaan Eijkman (1858–1930), physician and pathologist
Willem Einthoven (1860–1927), physician
Anthony Fokker (1890–1939), aviation engineer
Valerie Frissen (born 1960), social scientist
Richard D. Gill (born 1951), mathematician
Arend Heyting (1898–1980), mathematician
Gerardus 't Hooft (born 1946), physicist
Heike Kamerlingh Onnes (1853–1926), physicist
Jacobus Kapteyn (1851–1922), astronomer
Willem Hendrik Keesom (1878–1956), physicist
Hendrik Anthony Kramers (1894–1952), physicist
Pieter Kok (born 1972), physicist
Tjalling Koopmans (1910–1985), economist
Gerard Kuiper (1905–1973), astronomer
Hendrik Lorentz (1853–1928), physicist
Arend Lijphart (born 1936), political scientist
Simon van der Meer (1925–2011), physicist
Bram Moolenaar (born 1961), computer programmer, author of text-editor Vim
Wubbo Ockels (1946–2014), astronaut
Jan Oort (1900–1992), astronomer
Anton Pannekoek (1873–1960), astronomer
Guido van Rossum (born 1956), computer programmer, inventor of the Python programming language
Carel van Schaik (born 1953), primatologist
Maarten Schmidt (born 1929), astronomer
Willem de Sitter (1872–1934), mathematician, physicist and astronomer
Hendrik Tennekes (born 1936), aerodynamics professor
Jan Tinbergen (1903–1994), economist
Nico Tinbergen (1907–1988), ecologist
Martinus J. G. Veltman (1931–2021), physicist
Frans de Waal (born 1948), primatologist
Bartel Leendert van der Waerden (1903–1996), mathematician
Pieter Zeeman (1865–1943), physicist
Frits Zernike (1888–1966), physicist
Andre Geim (born 1958), Russian-born British-Dutch physicist
Konstantin Novoselov (born 1974), Russian-born British physicist, undertook his PhD studies at the University of Nijmegen before moving to the University of Manchester

Sports 

Estella Agsteribbe (1909–1943), Olympic champion gymnast (team combined exercises)
Christijan Albers (born 1979), Formula 1 driver
Ryan Babel (born 1986), football player
Raymond van Barneveld (born 1967), darts player
Marco van Basten (born 1964), manager and retired football player
Stan van Belkum (born 1961), water polo player 
Xander Bogaerts (born 1992), MLB player for the Boston Red Sox 
Carina Benninga (born 1962), field hockey player, Olympic champion, bronze
Dennis Bergkamp (born 1969), manager and retired football player
Juliette Bergmann (born 1958), IFBB pro bodybuilder
Jorrit Bergsma (born 1985), speed skater
Det de Beus (1958–2013), field hockey goalkeeper
Fanny Blankers-Koen (1918–2004), athlete
Jan Blokhuijsen (born 1989), speed skater
Rens Blom (born 1977), 2005 world champion pole vaulter
Frank de Boer (born 1970), retired football player
Ronald de Boer (born 1970), retired football player
Floris Jan Bovelander (born 1966), field hockey player
Mart Bras (born 1950), water polo player
Jacques Brinkman (born 1966), field hockey player
Giovanni van Bronckhorst (born 1975), football player
Inge de Bruijn (born 1974), swimmer
Roel Buikema (born 1976), football player
Ton Buunk (born 1952), water polo player
Johan Cruijff (1947–2016), retired football player and former manager
Edgar Davids (born 1973), football player
Marc Delissen (born 1965), field hockey player
Cees Jan Diepeveen (born 1956), field hockey player
Ellen van Dijk (born 1987), road and track cyclist, four-time world champion
Sjoukje Dijkstra (born 1942), figure skater
Robert Doornbos (born 1981), Formula One driver
 Eva Duldig (born 1938), Austrian-born Australian and Dutch tennis player, author
Francisco Elson (born 1976), NBA player for Utah Jazz and San Antonio Spurs
Jacco Eltingh (born 1970), tennis player
Max Euwe (1901–1981), chess player 
Didi Gregorius (born 1990), MLB player for New York Yankees 
Louis van Gaal (born 1951), football player and manager
Dan Gadzuric (born 1978), NBA player for Milwaukee Bucks
Anton Geesink (1934–2010), judoka
Yuri van Gelder (born 1983), gymnast
Yvonne van Gennip (born 1964), speed skater
Stefan Groothuis (born 1981), speed skater
Anky van Grunsven (born 1968), dressage
Ruud Gullit (born 1962), football player and coach
Paul Haarhuis (born 1966), tennis player
Eddy Hamel (1902–1943), Jewish-American soccer player for Dutch club AFC Ajax who was killed by the Nazis in Auschwitz concentration camp
Willem van Hanegem (born 1944), football player and coach
Wil Hartog (born 1948), Grand Prix motorcycle racer
Jimmy Floyd Hasselbaink (born 1972), football player
John Heitinga (born 1983), football player
Guus Hiddink (born 1946), manager and retired football player
Ellen Hoog (born 1986), field hockey player
Pieter van den Hoogenband (born 1978), swimmer
Ernesto Hoost (born 1965), kickboxer
Jan Janssen (born 1940), cyclist
Bob de Jong (born 1976), speed skater
Niek Kimmann (born 1996), champion BMX rider
Jelle Klaasen (born 1984), darts player
Bep van Klaveren (1907–1992), boxer
Patrick Kluivert (born 1976), football player
Sjinkie Knegt (born 1989), short-track speed skater
Ronald Koeman (born 1963), football player and manager
Ada Kok (born 1947), swimmer
Richard Krajicek (born 1971), tennis player
Sven Kramer (born 1986), speed skater
Ties Kruize (born 1952), field hockey player 
Dirk Kuyt (born 1980), football player
Nico Landeweerd (born 1954), water polo player
Ellen van Langen (born 1966), athlete
Elka de Levie (1905–1979), Olympic champion gymnast (team combined exercises)
Arie Luyendyk (born 1953), race car driver
Joost Luiten (born 1986), golfer
Rie Mastenbroek (1919–2003), swimmer
Loek van Mil (1984–2019), baseball player
Lion van Minden (1880–1944), Olympic fencer, who was killed in the Auschwitz concentration camp
Leontien van Moorsel (born 1970), cyclist
Bob Mulder (born 1974), football player
Boyito Mulder (born 1991), figure skater
Dustley Mulder (born 1985), football player
Eefke Mulder (born 1977), field hockey player
Erwin Mulder (born 1989), football player
Jan Mulder (born 1945), football player
Lau Mulder (1927–2006), field hockey player
Michel Mulder (born 1986), speed skater
Ronald Mulder (born 1986), speed skater
Teun Mulder (born 1981), cyclist
Youri Mulder (born 1969), football player
Bennie Muller (born 1938), football player
Ruud van Nistelrooy (born 1976), football player
Teun de Nooijer (born 1976), field hockey player 
Helena Nordheim (1903–1943), Olympic champion gymnast (team combined exercises)
Simon Okker (1881–1944), Olympic fencer killed in Auschwitz
Tom Okker (born 1944), tennis player, won 1973 French Open Men's Doubles (w/John Newcombe), 1976 US Open Men's Doubles (w/Marty Riessen), highest world ranking # 3 in singles, and # 1 in doubles
Tinus Osendarp (1916–2002), athlete
Alistair Overeem (born 1980), MMA fighter and former kickboxer
Mathieu van der Poel (born 1995), professional cyclist
Robin van Persie (born 1983), football player
Annie Polak (1906–1943), Olympic champion gymnast (team combined exercises)
Daniël de Ridder (born 1984), football player, forward winger/attacking midfielder (Wigan Athletic and U21 national team)
Frank Rijkaard (born 1962), football player and manager
Lucia Rijker (born 1967), boxer and kickboxer
Dorian van Rijsselberghe (born 1988), windsurfer
Rintje Ritsma (born 1970), speed skater
Arjen Robben (born 1984), football player
Johnny Roeg (1910–2003), football player, striker for Ajax
Gianni Romme (born 1973), speed skater
Wim Ruska (1940–2015), judoka
Bas Rutten (born 1965), mixed martial artist
Edwin van der Sar (born 1970), football player
Ard Schenk (born 1944), speed skater
Dafne Schippers (born 1992), athlete 
Clarence Seedorf (born 1976), football player
Aryeh "Arie" Selinger (born 1937), volleyball player & coach
Avital Selinger (born 1959), Olympic silver medallist
Gerald Sibon (born 1974), football player
Judijke Simons (1904–1943), Olympic champion gymnast (team combined exercises)
Emil Sitoci (born 1985), pro wrestler
Jan Smeekens (born 1985), speed skater
Rutger Smith (born 1981), athlete 
Dani (born 2002), esports player, anime enthusiast
Rik Smits (born 1966), NBA player
Wesley Sneijder (born 1984), football player
Petra van Staveren (born 1966), swimmer
Betty Stöve (born 1945), tennis player
Sjaak Swart (born 1938), footballer
Bernard D. H. Tellegen (1900–1990), electrical engineer, inventor, known for Tellegen's theorem in circuit theory
Carole Thate (born 1971), field hockey player
Jan Timman (born 1951), chess player
Regilio Tuur (born 1967), boxer
Jochem Uytdehaage (born 1976), speed skater
Wilma van den Berg (born 1947), sprinter, competed at the 1968 and 1972 Summer Olympics (which she left in the middle, in sympathy with the Israelis after the Munich Massacre)
Rick VandenHurk (born 1985), baseball player
Arnold Vanderlyde (born 1963), boxer
Jim Vandermeer (born 1980), Dutch-Canadian ice hockey player 
Bart Veldkamp (born 1967), speed skater
Kees Verkerk (born 1942), speed skater
Martin Verkerk (born 1978), tennis player
Jos Verstappen (born 1972), F1 Grand Prix racing driver
Max Verstappen (born 1997), F1 Grand Prix racing driver
Koen Verweij (born 1990), speed skater
Bert van Vlaanderen (born 1964), long-distance runner 
Gregory van der Wiel (born 1988), football player
Harm Wiersma (born 1953), checkers player
Hans Wouda (born 1941), water polo player 
Marcel Wouda (born 1972), swimmer
Joop Zoetemelk (born 1946), cyclist
Epke Zonderland (born 1986), gymnast

Other 

Willem Doorn (1836–1908), for 33 years vicar of Nobel Street Church in The Hague
Henry VI, Holy Roman Emperor (1165–1197), King of Germany (1190–1197), Holy Roman Emperor (1191–1197), King of Sicily (1194–1197)
Pope Adrian VI (1522–1523), pope from 1522 to 1523
Hendrikje van Andel-Schipper (1890–2005), oldest person in the world from 29 May 2004 to 30 August 2005
Corrie ten Boom (1892–1983), Christian activist during the Holocaust
Geert Adriaans Boomgaard, (1788–1899) officially first ever validated supercentenarian
Evert Dudok (born 1959), president of EADS Astrium Space Transportation
Gretta Duisenberg (born 1942), pro-Palestinian activist and the wife of Wim Duisenberg
Esmée van Eeghen (1918–1944), Dutch resistance member
Jacob Eelkens, first commander of the first Dutch fort in America (Fort Nassau)
Jetske van den Elsen (born 1972), television presenter
Ferry Piekart (born 1974), writer on children's games
Anne Frank (1929–1945), diarist in World War II Amsterdam
Harry Gideonse (1901–1985), American President of Brooklyn College, and Chancellor of the New School for Social Research
Alfred Henry (Freddy) Heineken (1923–2002), commercial mastermind of the Heineken Imperium; grandson of the founder of Heineken
Mata Hari (1876–1917), spy
Frans van der Hoff (born 1939), co-founder of Max Havelaar, the first Fairtrade certification initiative
Aletta Jacobs (1854–1929), first Dutch female to complete a university degree and the first female physician
Frederik Lauesen (born 1972), television presenter
Marinus van der Lubbe (1909–1934), see: Reichstag fire
George Maduro (1916–1945), Dutch Resistance member; the miniature city of Madurodam is named after him, as well as the Maduroplein area in Scheveningen, in The Hague
Adrienne van Melle-Hermans (1931–2007), peace activist
Maria van Pallaes (1587–1664), philanthropist in Utrecht
Anton Philips (1874–1951), co-founder of the Royal Philips Electronics
Gerard Philips (1858–1942), co-founder of the Royal Philips Electronics
Roel Pieper (born 1956), businessman and professor
Jan Sloot (1945–1999), inventor
Joran van der Sloot (born 1987), convicted murderer
Peter Stuyvesant (1592–1672), governor of the New Netherland

See also 

De Grootste Nederlander (The Greatest Dutchman)
List of Dutch Americans
List of Dutch Britons
List of Dutch Israelis
List of Dutch Indos
List of Dutch Jews
List of Dutch sportspeople
List of Dutch supercentenarians
List of Dutch Turks
List of Dutch vegetarians
List of Moroccan Dutch people
List of people from the Dutch Golden Age
List of Frisians
List of people from Amsterdam

References